St. Anthony Catholic School is a historic school in Fort Lauderdale, Florida. It is located at 820 Northeast 3rd Street. Saint Anthony Catholic School is the parochial Catholic school of  St. Anthony Catholic Church in Broward County. On September 26, 1997, it was added to the U.S. National Register of Historic Places. The school building was built in 1926 by John Olsson. The architect was Francis Abreu.

Notable alumni

Athletics
Chris Evert, former professional tennis player, member of International Tennis Hall of Fame
Jeanne Evert, former professional tennis player
Sarah Lihan, Olympian who placed 9th in women's sailing 470 at 2012 Summer Olympics
Brian Piccolo, former professional football player, inspiration for film Brian's Song
Mike Stanley, former professional baseball player and 1995 American League All-Star

Arts, entertainment, and civil service
Michael Connelly, author of The Lincoln Lawyer and former president of Mystery Writers of America
Charles Liteky, former Army chaplain and Medal of Honor recipient
William J. Zloch, U.S. District Court Judge for the Southern District of Florida

References

External links

 
 Broward County listings at National Register of Historic Places

Catholic schools in Florida
National Register of Historic Places in Broward County, Florida
Schools in Fort Lauderdale, Florida
Private elementary schools in Florida
Private middle schools in Florida
K–8 schools in Florida
Private schools in Broward County, Florida
1926 establishments in Florida